Jed Davies (born 6 January 1988) is a Welsh professional football coach who currently is an assistant coach with HFX Wanderers in the Canadian Premier League.

Coaching career

Clubs and National Teams

Davies worked at Oxford University AFC alongside Mickey Lewis and Jon Collins from 2013 to 2014 before going on to work with Magnus Pehrsson, Manager of the Estonia national football team in 2015.

On August 9, 2016, Davies was hired by USL Championship side Ottawa Fury FC alongside Bruce Grobbelaar, Julian de Guzman and Martin Nash as a first team assistant coach, working under head coach Paul Dalglish. Davies moved to Miami FC in the USL Championship In 2021 as an assistant coach.

On February 6, 2023, head coach Patrice Gheisar named Jed Davies as an Assistant Coach and Head of Youth Development at HFX Wanderers FC in the Canadian Premier League

HFX Wanderers Founder and President Derek Martin said “Jed’s addition represents a significant investment on our behalf to improve the development pathway in our region, It remains our goal to see multiple Atlantic Canadian players earn their way onto the Wanderers’ first-team roster. We are excited to put our new technical staff to work developing our future Wanderers.”

Coach Education

Davies was a co-founder of Inspire Football Coach Education UK, a coach education company that featured the likes of Dick Bate, Raymond Verheijen, FC Barcelona's Albert Capellas, Brian Ashton and many other reputable guests.

Davies has presented for a number of clubs and coach education companies and events such as the World Football Academy Expert Meeting, owned by Dutch coach Raymond Verheijen. Verheijen (former Wales Assistant Manager) referred to Davies as one of the "next generation" of coaches who he appreciated as an educator of football tactics.

In 2019, Davies became a professor at the University of Ottawa where he taught Strategy in Sport: Association Football.

Published Books

In 2013 Davies published Coaching the Tiki-Taka Style of Play, a book positively reviewed by Eddie Howe among many others. Eddie Howe commented how the book was one of "Inspiration, different ideas and new angles that can make you better" during his Soccer AM interview on Sky Sports.

The Philosophy of Football: In Shadows of Marcelo Bielsa was published in 2016. The book included insights from Mark Sampson, Chris Davies and those close to the working methods of Marcelo Bielsa.

References

Living people
Welsh football managers
1988 births
Sportspeople from Cardiff
Ottawa Fury FC non-playing staff
Miami FC coaches
HFX Wanderers FC non-playing staff